Pyunik is an Armenian football club based in Yerevan, Armenia.

History

1990's
Pyunik first qualified for European competition in 1996, after their second Armenian Premier League title earned them entry in to the 1996–97 UEFA Cup. Entering at the Preliminary round stage, Pyunik faced HJK Helsinki over two legs in July 1996, defeating them 3-1 at home before losing 5-2 away in Helsinki to be knocked out 5-6 on aggregate. The following season, after winning the league for a third time, Pyunik this time entered into the 1997–98 UEFA Champions League at the First qualifying round, facing Hungarian champions MTK Budapest. MTK Budapest won the first leg 2-0 in Yerevan, before defeating Pyunik 4-3 in Budapest to win 6-3 on aggregate.

2000's
After a Five year break, Pyunik returned to European competition in 2002–03, entering the UEFA Champions League after winning the 2001 Armenian Premier League. This started a Ten-year streak for Pyunik in the UEFA Champions League qualifiers, up to the 2011–12 UEFA Champions League.

2010's
Pyunik featured in European competitions every year during the 2010s. After two season in the UEFA Champions League at the start of the decade, Pyunik entered the UEFA Europa League for the first time during the 2012–13 season. They would then feature in the UEFA Europa League every season for the remainder of the decade, apart from a singular year in the UEFA Champions League during the 2015–16 season.

2020's
After a two-year break from European competition, Pyunik returned to the UEFA Champions League during the 2022–23 season. In the First Qualifying round, Pyunik where drawn against CFR Cluj, where they drew 0-0 at home, and then 2-2 in Romania. The game was still level after extra time, sending the game to penalties where Pyunik won 4-3. In the Second Qualifying round Pyunik then faced F91 Dudelange from Luxembourg, where they were victorious 4-2 on aggregate. Pyunik lost the first leg at home 1-0, but then went on to win 4-1 away in Luxembourg to secure a Third Qualifying round match up against Red Star Belgrade. Pyunik were knocked out of the Champions League by Red Star in the Third Qualifying round, after being defeated 5-0 away in Serbia and 2-0 at home. As a result of their defeat to Red Star Belgrade, Pyunik dropped down in to the UEFA Europa League, where they were drawn with Moldovan Champions Sheriff Tiraspol.

Matches

Player statistics

Appearances

Goalscorers

Clean sheets

Overall record

By competition

By country

By club

Notes

References

External links

Europe
Pyunik